Libera, My Love is a 1975 Italian drama film directed by Mauro Bolognini and starring Claudia Cardinale.

Cast
 Claudia Cardinale as Libera Valente
 Bruno Cirino as Matteo Zanoni
 Adolfo Celi as Libera's father
 Philippe Leroy as Franco Testa
 Luigi Diberti as Ceccarelli, the taxi driver
 Tullio Altamura
 Rosalba Neri as Wanda, wife of Testa
 Eleonora Morana
 Rosita Pisano
 Luigi Patriarca
 Marco Lucantoni as Libera's son
 M. Vittoria Virgili
 Elisabetta Virgili
 Bekim Fehmiu as Sandro Poggi
 Franco Balducci

References

External links

1975 films
Italian drama films
1970s Italian-language films
1975 drama films
Films directed by Mauro Bolognini
Films set in Rome
Films set in Tuscany
Films set in Emilia-Romagna
Films scored by Ennio Morricone
Films with screenplays by Luciano Vincenzoni
1970s Italian films